Heidrun Barth (born 16 March 1961) is a German former rowing cox. She competed in two events at the 1984 Summer Olympics.

References

External links
 

1961 births
Living people
German female rowers
Olympic rowers of West Germany
Rowers at the 1984 Summer Olympics
Sportspeople from Heilbronn
Coxswains (rowing)